Edwin Ruthven Meade (July 6, 1836 – November 28, 1889) was an American lawyer and politician who served one term as a U.S. Representative from New York from 1875 to 1877.

Biography 
Born in Norwich, New York, Meade pursued an academic course. He studied law. He was admitted to the bar in 1858 and commenced practice in Norwich, New York. He moved to New York City in 1872 and continued the practice of law.

Congress 
Meade was elected as a Democrat to the Forty-fourth Congress (March 4, 1875 – March 3, 1877). He was not a candidate for reelection in 1876.

Later career and death 
He resumed the practice of his profession. He died in New York City November 28, 1889. He was interred in Greene Cemetery, Greene, New York.

References 

 

1836 births
1889 deaths
Democratic Party members of the United States House of Representatives from New York (state)
19th-century American politicians